Zolotukhino is a rural locality (a khutor) in Makarovsky Selsoviet Rural Settlement, Kurchatovsky District, Kursk Oblast, Russia. Population:

Geography 
The khutor is located on the Lomna River (a right tributary of the Seym), 68 km from the Russia–Ukraine border, 30.5 km west of Kursk, 9 km north-east of the district center – the town Kurchatov, 16 km from the selsoviet center – Makarovka.

 Climate
Zolotukhino has a warm-summer humid continental climate (Dfb in the Köppen climate classification).

Transport 
Zolotukhino is located 21.5 km from the federal route  Crimea Highway, 4 km from the road of regional importance  (Kursk – Lgov – Rylsk – border with Ukraine), 3.5 km from the road of intermunicipal significance  (Seym River – Mosolovo – Nizhneye Soskovo), on the road  (38N-575 – Zolotukhino), 5.5 km from the nearest railway halt 433 km (railway line Lgov I — Kursk).

The rural locality is situated 37 km from Kursk Vostochny Airport, 130 km from Belgorod International Airport and 241 km from Voronezh Peter the Great Airport.

References

Notes

Sources

Rural localities in Kurchatovsky District, Kursk Oblast